The San Leandro Tech Campus is a business park being constructed by Westlake Development Partners LLC in downtown San Leandro, California, near the San Leandro BART station. Construction of Phase 1 of the project began in 2014, and was completed in 2016. The primary tenant of the first phase of construction is OSIsoft, a software company based in San Leandro. Phase 2 of the project is expected to be completed in 2019 with Ghirardelli Chocolate Company as the lead tenant.

The site is the permanent location for the sculpture Truth is Beauty by Marco Cochrane. The sculpture generated some controversy, as it is a large ( tall) nude outdoor sculpture, albeit on private property.

References

External links
San Leandro Tech Center website

Buildings and structures in San Leandro, California
Science and technology in the San Francisco Bay Area
Business parks of the United States
Economy of the San Francisco Bay Area